is a Japanese politician of the Liberal Democratic Party, a member of the House of Councillors in the Diet (national legislature). A graduate of Chuo University and Boston University, he was elected to the House of Councillors for the first time in 2007 after unsuccessful runs in 2002 and 2004.

References

External links 
  in Japanese.

Members of the House of Councillors (Japan)
Chuo University alumni
Boston University alumni
Living people
1963 births
Liberal Democratic Party (Japan) politicians